The 2016–17 Northwestern Wildcats women's basketball team represented Northwestern University during the 2016–17 NCAA Division I women's basketball season. The Wildcats, led by ninth-year head coach Joe McKeown, played their home games at the Welsh-Ryan Arena as members of the Big Ten Conference. They finished the season 20–11, 8–8 in Big Ten play to finish in a tie for eighth place. They defeated Iowa in the second round of the Big Ten women's tournament before losing to Ohio State. Despite having 20 wins, they were not invited to a postseason tournament first time since 2013.

Roster

Schedule

|-
!colspan=9 style="background:#431F81; color:#FFFFFF;"| Exhibition

|-
!colspan=9 style="background:#431F81; color:#FFFFFF;"| Non-conference regular season

|-
!colspan=9 style="background:#431F81; color:#FFFFFF;"| Big Ten regular season

|-
!colspan=9 style="background:#431F81; color:#FFFFFF;" |Big Ten Women's Tournament

Rankings

See also
 2016–17 Northwestern Wildcats men's basketball team

References

Northwestern Wildcats women's basketball seasons
Northwestern
Northwestern Wild
Northwestern Wild